A high pressure watertube boiler (also spelled water-tube and water tube) is a type of boiler in which water circulates in tubes heated externally by the fire. Fuel is burned inside the furnace, creating hot gas which boils water in the steam-generating tubes. In smaller boilers, additional generating tubes are separate in the furnace, while larger utility boilers rely on the water-filled tubes that make up the walls of the furnace to generate steam.

The heated water/steam mixture then rises into the steam drum. Here, saturated steam is drawn off the top of the drum. In some services, the steam passes through tubes in the hot gas path, (a superheater) to become superheated. Superheated steam is defined as steam that is heated above the boiling point at a given pressure.  Superheated steam is a dry gas and therefore is typically used to drive turbines, since water droplets can severely damage turbine blades.

Saturated water at the bottom of the steam drum returns to the lower drum via large-bore 'downcomer tubes', where it pre-heats the feedwater supply. (In large utility boilers, the feedwater is supplied to the steam drum and the downcomers supply water to the bottom of the waterwalls). To increase economy of the boiler, exhaust gases are also used to pre-heat combustion air blown into the burners, and to warm the feedwater supply in an economizer. Such watertube boilers in thermal power stations are also called steam generating units.

The older fire-tube boiler design, in which the water surrounds the heat source and gases from combustion pass through tubes within the water space, is typically a much weaker structure and is rarely used for pressures above . A significant advantage of the watertube boiler is that there is less chance of a catastrophic failure: there is not a large volume of water in the boiler nor are there large mechanical elements subject to failure.

A water tube boiler was patented by Blakey of England in 1766 and was made by Dallery of France in 1780.

Applications 
"The ability of watertube boilers to be designed without the use of excessively large and thick walled pressure vessels makes these boilers particularly attractive in applications that require dry, high-pressure, high-energy steam, including steam turbine power generation".

Owing to their superb working properties, the use of watertube boilers is highly preferred in the following major areas:
 Variety of process applications in industries
 Chemical processing divisions
 Pulp and Paper manufacturing plants
 Refining units
For example, the Ivanpah solar-power station uses two Rentech Type-D watertube boilers for plant warmup, and when operating as a fossil fueled power station.

Stationary 
Modern boilers for power generation are almost entirely water-tube designs, owing to their ability to operate at higher pressures. Where process steam is required for heating or as a chemical component, then there is still a small niche for fire-tube boilers.  One notable exception is in typical Nuclear power stations (Pressurized Water Reactors), where the steam generators are generally configured similar to firetube boiler designs.  In these applications the hot gas path through the "Firetubes" actually carries the very hot/high pressure primary coolant from the reactor, and steam is generated on the external surface of the tubes.

Marine 
Their ability to work at higher pressures has led to marine boilers being almost entirely water-tube. This change began around 1900, and traced the adoption of turbines for propulsion rather than reciprocating (i.e. piston) engines – although watertube boilers were also used with reciprocating engines, and firetube boilers were also used in many marine turbine applications.

Railway 
There has been no significant adoption of water-tube boilers for railway locomotives. A handful of experimental designs were produced, but none of these were successful or led to their widespread use. Most water-tube railway locomotives, especially in Europe, used the Schmidt system. Most were compounds, and a few uniflows. The Norfolk and Western Railway's Jawn Henry was an exception, as it used a steam turbine combined with an electric transmission.

 LMS 6399 Fury
 Rebuilt completely after a fatal accident
 LNER 10000 "Hush hush"
 Using a Yarrow boiler, rather than Schmidt. Not successful and re-boilered with a conventional boiler.

Hybrids 
A slightly more successful adoption was the use of hybrid water-tube / fire-tube systems. As the hottest part of a locomotive boiler is the firebox, it was an effective design to use a water-tube design here and a conventional fire-tube boiler as an economiser (i.e. pre-heater) in the usual position.

One famous example of this was the USA Baldwin 4-10-2 No. 60000, built in 1926. Operating as a compound at a boiler pressure of  it covered over  successfully. After a year though, it became clear that any economies were overwhelmed by the extra costs and it was retired to a museum display at the Franklin Institute in Philadelphia, Pennsylvania. A series of twelve experimental locomotives were constructed at the Baltimore and Ohio Railroad's Mt. Clare shops under the supervision of George H. Emerson, but none of them was replicated in any numbers.

The only railway use of water-tube boilers in any numbers was the Brotan boiler, invented in Austria in 1902 by Johann Brotan and found in rare examples throughout Europe. Hungary, though, was a keen user and had around 1,000 of them. Like the Baldwin, this combined a water-tube firebox with a fire-tube barrel. The original characteristic of the Brotan was a long steam drum running above the main barrel, making it resemble a Flaman boiler in appearance.

Road 
While the traction engine was usually built using its locomotive boiler as its frame, other types of steam road vehicles such as lorries and cars have used a wide range of different boiler types. Road transport pioneers Goldsworthy Gurney and Walter Hancock both used water-tube boilers in their steam carriages around 1830.

Most undertype wagons used water-tube boilers. Many manufacturers used variants of the vertical cross-tube boiler, including Atkinson, Clayton, Garrett and Sentinel. Other types include the Clarkson 'thimble tube' and the Foden O-type wagon's pistol-shaped boiler.

Steam fire-engine makers such as Merryweather usually used water-tube boilers for their rapid steam-raising capacity.

Many steam cars used water-tube boilers, and the Bolsover Express company even made a water-tube replacement for the Stanley Steamer fire-tube boiler.

Design variations

D-type boiler 
The 'D-type' is the most common type of small- to medium-sized boilers, similar to the one shown in the schematic diagram. It is used in both stationary and marine applications. It consists of a large steam drum vertically connected to a smaller water drum (a.k.a. "mud drum") via multiple steam-generating tubes.  These drums and tubes as well as the oil-fired burner are enclosed by water-walls - additional water-filled tubes spaced close together so as to prevent gas flow between them.  These water wall tubes are connected to both the steam and water drums, so that they act as a combination of preheaters and downcomers as well as decreasing heat loss to the boiler shell.

M-type boilers 
The M-type boilers were used in many US World War II warships including hundreds of Fletcher-class destroyers.  Three sets of tubes form the shape of an M, and create a separately fired superheater that allows better superheat temperature control.  In addition to the mud drum shown on a D-type boiler, an M-type has a water-screen header and a waterwall header at the bottom of the two additional rows of vertical tubes and downcomers.

Low water content 
The low water content boiler has a lower and upper header connected by watertubes that are directly impinged upon from the burner. This is a "furnace-less" boiler that can generate steam and react quickly to changes in load.

Babcock & Wilcox boiler 

Designed by the American firm of Babcock & Wilcox, this type has a single drum, with feedwater drawn from the bottom of the drum into a header that supplies inclined water-tubes. The watertubes supply steam back into the top of the drum. Furnaces are located below the tubes and drum.

This type of boiler was used by the Royal Navy's Leander-class frigates and in United States Navy New Orleans-class cruisers.

Stirling boiler 

The Stirling boiler has near-vertical, almost-straight watertubes that zig-zag between a number of steam and water drums. Usually there are three banks of tubes in a "four drum" layout, but certain applications use variations designed with a different number of drums and banks.

They are mainly used as stationary boilers, owing to their large size, although the large grate area does also encourage their ability to burn a wide range of fuels. Originally coal-fired in power stations, they also became widespread in industries that produced combustible waste and required process steam. Paper pulp mills could burn waste bark, sugar refineries their bagasse waste. It is a horizontal drum type of boiler.

Yarrow 

Named after its designers, the then Poplar-based Yarrow Shipbuilders, this type of three-drum boiler has three drums in a delta formation connected by watertubes. The drums are linked by straight watertubes, allowing easy tube-cleaning. This does, however, mean that the tubes enter the drums at varying angles, a more difficult joint to caulk. Outside the firebox, a pair of cold-leg pipes between each drum act as downcomers.

Due to its three drums, the Yarrow boiler has a greater water capacity. Hence, this type is usually used in older marine boiler applications. Its compact size made it attractive for use in transportable power generation units during World War II. In order to make it transportable, the boiler and its auxiliary equipment (fuel oil heating, pumping units, fans etc.), turbines, and condensers were mounted on wagons to be transported by rail.

White-Forster 
The White-Forster type is similar to the Yarrow, but with tubes that are gradually curved. This makes their entry into the drums perpendicular, thus simpler to make a reliable seal.

Thornycroft 

Designed by the shipbuilder John I. Thornycroft & Company, the Thornycroft type features a single steam drum with two sets of watertubes either side of the furnace. These tubes, especially the central set, have sharp curves. Apart from obvious difficulties in cleaning them, this may also give rise to bending forces as the tubes warm up, tending to pull them loose from the tubeplate and creating a leak. There are two furnaces, venting into a common exhaust, giving the boiler a wide base tapering profile.

Forced circulation boiler 
In a forced circulation boiler, a pump is added to speed up the flow of water through the tubes.

Other types 
 O-type boiler
 A-type boiler
 Flex-tube boiler
 M-type control superheater

See also 
 Three-drum boiler
 Clarkson thimble tube boiler
 Corner tube boiler
 Internally rifled boiler tubes (also known as serve tubes)

References

External links 

 
Boilers